Gökçeören (also Seyretköyü, Seyretköy, and Seyret) is a village in the District of Kaş, Antalya Province, Turkey.

References

 

Villages in Kaş District